is a railway station in city of Nagakute, Aichi Prefecture, Japan operated by the Aichi Rapid Transit Company.

Lines

Layout
The station has two elevated island platform with the station building underneath. The station building has automated ticket machines, Manaca automated turnstiles and is staffed.

Platforms

Adjacent stations

Station history

During Expo 2005, the World Expo that was held in Aichi on that year, this station provided main access to the venue. At that time, it was named for the expo venue, but in the following year it was renamed to its current name.

Passenger statistics
In fiscal 2017, the station was used by 4,912 passengers daily.

Surrounding area
 Expo 2005 Aichi Commemorative Park
 Aichi Prefectural University
 Ghibli Park

See also
 List of Railway Stations in Japan

References

External links

Linimo official home page

Railway stations in Japan opened in 2005
Railway stations in Aichi Prefecture
Nagakute, Aichi